Harry Bell (18 April 1862 – 18 January 1948) was an English footballer who played at full back. He was born in West Bromwich, and after attending Beeches Road School, worked at the local George Salter's Spring Works. He joined West Bromwich Albion in 1879, and turned professional (along with his teammates) in the summer of 1885. Bell retired in 1887 due to injury.

Footnotes

References
Citations

Sources

1862 births
1948 deaths
Sportspeople from West Bromwich
English footballers
West Bromwich Albion F.C. players
Association football defenders
FA Cup Final players